Ingain is an extinct Jê language of Brazil, closely related to the Southern Jê languages Kaingáng and Laklãnõ (Xokléng). Kimdá may have been a dialect. Ingain was spoken along the middle Paraná River, from the Iguatemi River in the north to the Arroyo Yabebiry in the south.

Related "South Kaingáng" languages were:
Guayana / Wayana / Gualachí / Guanhanan - extinct language once spoken between the Uruguay River and Paraná River, Rio Grande do Sul, Brazil
Amhó or Ivitorocái - extinct language from Riacho Ivitoracái, Paraguay. Listed as separate from the Ingain cluster by Mason (1950).

See also
Kaingang language

References

Jê languages
Extinct languages of South America
Languages of Brazil
Languages extinct in the 20th century